Whodini is the eponymous debut studio album by American hip hop group Whodini, released on October 13, 1983 by Jive Records. It spawned two hit singles: 1982 single "Magic's Wand" and 1983 single "The Haunted House of Rock". Audio production was handled by Conny Plank, Heatwave's Roy Carter, Thomas Dolby, and the Willesden Dodgers (Nigel Green, Pete Q. Harris, Richard Jon Smith).

Release
The album itself did not reach any major music chart. However, Thomas Dolby-produced single "Magic's Wand" peaked at number 11 on the Dance Club Songs and number 45 on the Hot R&B/Hip-Hop Songs and Willesden Dodges-produced track "The Haunted House of Rock" peaked at number 27 on the Dance Club Songs and number 55 on the Hot R&B/Hip-Hop Songs.

Critical reception

From a contemporary review, Ken Tucker of The Philadelphia Inquirer gave the album four stars out of five, stating that "Unlike so many dance-club hit makers, Whodini can sustain its cleverness over the length of an entire album."

Track listing

Personnel
 Jalil Hutchins — performer
 John "Ecstacy" Fletcher — performer
 Thomas Jerome Pearse — additional vocals (track 6)
 Nigel Green — producer (tracks: 1, 3, 6, 8), mixing (tracks: 1, 4, 5, 8)
 Peter Brian Harris — producer (tracks: 1, 3, 6, 8)
 Richard Jon Smith — producer (tracks: 1, 3, 6, 8)
 Konrad "Conny" Plank — producer and mixing (tracks: 2, 7)
 Roy Peter Carter — producer (tracks: 3, 6)
 Thomas Dolby — producer (tracks: 4, 5)
 Bryan Chuck New — engineer (tracks: 3, 6)
 Sönke Bahns — mastering
 John Pinderhughes — photography
 Matt Wallis — tape operator

References

External links
 

Whodini albums
1983 debut albums
Jive Records albums
Albums produced by Thomas Dolby
Albums produced by Conny Plank